Adavipolam is a revenue village in the Yanam District of Puducherry, India.

References 

 

Villages in Yanam district